The Kajaki Dam is one of the two major hydroelectric power dams of Helmand province in southern Afghanistan. The dam is located on the Helmand River 100 miles (161 km) north-west of Kandahar and is operated by the Helmand and Arghandab Valley Authority. It has a dual function, to provide electricity and to irrigate some 650,000 acres (1800 km2) of an otherwise arid land. Water discharging from the dam traverses some 300 miles (500 km) of downstream irrigation canals feeding farmland.  it produces up to 151 megawatts (MW) of electricity.

The dam controls the output of the main watershed which feeds the Sistan Basin.

History 
Final studies for the dam began in 1946 and a preliminary design was crafted in 1950. The dam was built between 1951 and 1953 by the Morrison–Knudsen firm as part of the Helmand Valley Authority project.

In 1975, USAID commissioned the initial installation of two 16.5 MW generating units in a powerhouse constructed at the toe of the dam. This first stage powerhouse was actually constructed to house three equally sized units. Only units 1 and 3 were installed originally. 

Before the Soviets invaded Afghanistan in 1979, the contractors had already left the country. They were also excavating an emergency spillway which was never completed.

The Kajaki dam powerhouse was a bombing target of the US Air Force during their attack on Afghanistan in October 2001.

With funding from USAID, World Bank and other donors, Units 1 and 3 were fully rehabilitated and the power station had an installed capacity of 33 MW. Unit 1 was operational in September 2005 and Unit 3 in October 2009.
The Unit 3 rehabilitation began in May 2006, with a scheduled return to service in early 2007. The new 18.5 MW Unit 2 turbine/generator had been contracted to China Machine Building International Corporation, which is headquartered in Beijing. The work was to be supervised by Montgomery Watson Harza and was planned to be completed by June 2007 but the work was not completed.

In February 2007, the Kajakai Dam was the subject of fighting between coalition forces and Taliban insurgents, as part of Operation Kryptonite. According to the governor of Helmand province, Assadullah Wafa, over 700 Taliban insurgents (including Pakistanis, Chechens and Uzbeks) coming from neighboring Pakistan fought against over 300 coalition troops. Most of the coalition troops were Dutch and British. The number of casualties mentioned varies.

Central to the long term energy security and sustained economic growth of southern Afghanistan is the rehabilitation and expansion of the Kajaki hydroelectric power plant. As a critical component of the Southern Electrical Power System, the capacity of the Kajaki plant would be expanded to 51 MW with a future potential for an additional 100 MW.

In late August 2008 a contingent of ISAF and Afghan troops successfully transported the third turbine (Unit 2) from Kandahar to the Kajaki Dam. The operation was British-led and codenamed Operation Oqab Tsuka, meaning "Eagle's Summit" in Pashto. 

A BBC report on the unassembled and uninstalled turbine in June 2011 estimated project completion in late 2013. Despite the turbine being delivered onsite in 2008, over 7 years later it had still not been installed, as its installation required 700 tonnes of cement which could not be delivered to the dam due to attacks by the Taliban. The purpose of these projects were to improve distribution of electrical power to the people of Helmand and Kandahar provinces. 

In February 2015, USAID anticipated completion in 2016. When the turbine came online, and a new grid of power lines were established to distribute the power, the dam was able to provide 51 megawatts of power. The project reduced reliance on more expensive and dirtier diesel generation, and nearly doubled the amount of renewable energy distributed to Kandahar. The Afghan electric authority assumed full responsibility for operations and maintenance in March 2017.

U.S. Army Corps of Engineers
The United States Army Corps of Engineers (USACE) had several concurrent project plans associated with the Kajaki Dam with a total program amount of approximately $205 million. Together, the projects would improve water flow for irrigation and electric power generation. The first phase would repair the dam's intake structure. The gates did not close, so no maintenance could be performed on the gates or the irrigation outlet tunnels.

The project included the rehabilitation of existing intake structure components: intake bulkhead gate, steel sliding gate, crane, crane hoist assembly, lifting assembly, embedded parts, and hydrology gauge.

The second phase would rehabilitate the three  roto valves inside the irrigation tunnel and three  jet valves at the outlet end of the irrigation tunnel. A roto valve is designed to open and close relatively easily, despite high fluid pressure. Jet valves are installed as part of the outlet structure, and decrease the pressure of the water exiting the bottom of the dam, which prevents erosion and scouring. Another part of the project was to evaluate the current condition of inoperable piezometers at the dam and seek bids to repair or replace them.

Southern Electrical Power System

This two-phased project would improve access to electric power for residents of Helmand and Kandahar provinces. The SEPS—Helmand phase included rebuilding the Kajaki Substation; replacing the 20kV line from the Kajaki Substation to Tangi; a new switchyard at Tangi; a new substation at Musa Qal'eh; a new 110kV line from Kajaki Substation to Musa Qal'eh Substation; a new 20kV line from Kajaki Substation to Kajaki Village, and the rebuilding of a 110kV line from Kajaki Substation to Sangin.

The project also included rebuilding the Sangin North Substation, a new substation at Sangin South, rebuilding a 110kV line from Sangin to Durai Junction, and rebuilding a 110kV line from Durai Junction to Lashkar Gah. USACE awarded the project to Perini Management Services, Inc. of Framingham, Mass., with a 550-day period of performance.

The SEPS-Kandahar project included repairing an existing 110kV line from Durai Junction to Kandahar City, constructing new substations at Maiwand and Pushmool, and upgrading substations at Breshna Kot.

As of July 2022, Kajaki Dam generates up to 151 MW of electricity.

Water supply accord

Under a monarchy-era accord signed between Iran and Afghanistan in 1972, Afghanistan agreed to release water at a rate of at least . In 1998, when Iran threatened to attack in retaliation for the killing of Iranians who were claimed to be diplomats in Mazari Sharif when the Taliban retook that city from the Northern Alliance the second time, the Taliban briefly stopped the flow of water to Iran, using a canal to divert the Helmand's flow southward into the Gowd Zerrah Depression. During that time the Helmand valley was going through a five-year drought. As a result, Iran's Hamun-e Helmand lake dried up, as did regional pastures, leading to the death of flora, fauna, cattle and birds in the Sistan and Baluchestan Province of Iran.

Climate

In film
The American effort to build the dam is mentioned in Adam Curtis's 2015 documentary Bitter Lake. According to the film, the dam caused a salinization of the fields allowing the cultivation of opium.
Kajaki is a 2014 British war docu-drama film based on the Kajaki Dam incident, involving a small unit of British soldiers positioned near the Kajaki dam.

See also

 Energy in Afghanistan
 List of dams and reservoirs in Afghanistan
 List of rivers of Afghanistan

References

External links 

USAID documents related to or mentioning Kajaki Dam
UK troops in huge turbine mission

Helmand River
Dams in Afghanistan
Hydroelectric power stations in Afghanistan
Rock-filled dams
Dams completed in 1953
1953 establishments in Afghanistan
Energy infrastructure completed in 1975